Octavio Pisano is an American actor. He currently plays Joe Velasco on Law & Order: Special Victims Unit, and prior to that was in Coyote and the indie film Ms. Purple.  He has also appeared in one episode of the Law & Order: Organized Crime spin-off. He was promoted to series regular in SVU after his first three appearances.

The character of Velasco was introduced in the 23rd season of SVU as an undercover cop from Ciudad Juarez.

References

External links
 

Living people
American male television actors
Year of birth missing (living people)
21st-century American male actors
Place of birth missing (living people)